Edgar Edgar Musikahan (English translation: Edgar Edgar Musical Show) is the fourth studio album and fifth overall album of the Filipino alternative rock band Parokya ni Edgar, released in 2002 by Universal Records.

Track listing

References

External links 
 Parokya ni Edgar's Facebook Page
 Universal Records Blog
 Official website

2002 albums
Parokya ni Edgar albums
Universal Records (Philippines) albums